Frank Brady (born March 15, 1934 in Brooklyn, New York), is an American writer, editor, biographer and educator. Chairman of the Department of Mass Communications, Journalism, Television and Film at St. John's University, New York, he is founding editor of Chess Life magazine.

Biography
Brady is chairman of the Department of Mass Communications, Journalism, Television and Film at St. John's University, New York. He is professor of communication arts and journalism at that university. He has also been an adjunct professor of journalism for the past 25 years at Barnard College of Columbia University. He has a Bachelor of Science, State University of New York; Master of Fine Arts, Columbia University; M.A., Ph.D., New York University.

In 1960, Brady was the founding editor of Chess Life as a magazine. (Previously, it had been a newspaper). He was later editor of Chessworld Magazine and he still later worked as an editor for Ralph Ginzburg and Hugh Hefner. He is an International Arbiter, recognized by FIDE, the World Chess Federation, and has directed many major chess tournaments. He was secretary of the United States Chess Federation 2003–2005.

He has written many books, on a variety of subjects. He is chairman of a department at St. John's University, overseeing a multimillion-dollar budget, 60 faculty, and 900 students.

He served as arbiter of international chess tournaments in 2001 and 2004 in New York. He has been elected to, and serves as an active voting member of the British Academy of Film and Television Arts, and PEN, the international writers' organization.

He is a writer, editor and publisher of international renown. He wrote one of the best-selling chess books in history, Profile of a Prodigy, the biography of Bobby Fischer, as well as countless other books and articles on chess and other subjects. A new biography of Fischer entitled Endgame: The Spectacular Rise and Fall of Bobby Fischer was published in 2011. He has been involved with radio and film projects. His wife, Maxine, also writes books.

On June 18, 2007, Brady was elected president of the Marshall Chess Club.

Publications
 Bobby Fischer: Profile of a Prodigy 
 Hefner 
 Onassis, an extravagant life 
 Barbra Streisand: an illustrated biography 
 Brady & Lawless's favorite bookstores 
 Chess: how to improve your technique (1974) 	
 Chess (A Concise Guide)  
 Citizen Welles: a biography of Orson Welles 
 Paul Block: a life of friendship, power, and politics 
 How to get rich with a 1-800 number 
 Endgame: The Spectacular Rise and Fall of Bobby Fischer,

See also 
 Presidents of the United States Chess Federation
 Executive Directors of the United States Chess Federation

References

External links 
 
 
 
 
 
 

1934 births
Living people
American chess players
American magazine editors
American male journalists
American magazine publishers (people)
American chess writers
Chess arbiters
Writers from Brooklyn
State University of New York alumni
Columbia University School of the Arts alumni
New York University alumni
Barnard College faculty
Faculty
Journalists from New York City